The 2010 CAF Champions League group stage matches took place between 16 July and 19 September 2010. The draw for the two groups took place on 13 May 2010, at the CAF Headquarters in Cairo.

The group stage featured 8 qualifiers from the second round of qualifying.

At the completion of the group stage, the top two teams in each group advanced to the semifinals.

Seeding

The seeding for the group stage was announced on 12 May.  Each group consists of a team from each of the 4 pots.

 Title Holder

Groups

Group A

Group B

Goal scorers
As of 10:34 (UTC), 20 September 2010

Players in bold are still competing in the competition

References

Group stage